Pink is an English surname.

People

Alfred Pink (1853–1931), English cricketer
Ariel Pink (b. 1978), United States musician
Arthur Pink (1886–1952), English Christian evangelist and Biblical scholar
Bonner Pink (1912–1984), British politician; Lord Mayor of Portsmouth 1961-62
Bonnie Pink (Kaori Asada) (b. 1973), Japanese musician
Brian Pink (contemporary), Australian Statistician, head of the Australian Bureau of Statistics
Celinda Pink (b. 1957), United States musician
Daniel H. Pink (contemporary), United States author and journalist
Hubert Pink (1878-1946), English athlete in cricket
Markus Pink (b. 1991), Austrian athlete in football
Noah Pink, screenwriter, television producer, director, and swimmer
Olive Pink (1884–1975), Australian botanical illustrator, anthropologist, gardener, and activist for aboriginal rights
Robert Pink (1578-1647), English clergyman and academic
Sidney W. Pink (1916–2002), United States film director and producer
Stephen Pink (b. 1981), English public relations academic
Steve Pink (b. 1966), United States actor, writer, and film director
Wal Pink (1862-1922), English music hall performer, writer and theatre producer

Fiction

Danny Pink, character in Doctor Who

See also
Pink (singer)
Lady Pink (graffiti artist)

Surnames from nicknames